Evolution of a Man is the eleventh studio album by Brian McKnight. It was released by E1 Music on October 27, 2009 in the United States. McKnight worked with singers Jill Scott and Stevie Wonder on the album. It received mixed reviews upon its release and peaked at number three on the US Top R&B/Hip-Hop Albums chart. The first single, "What I've Been Waiting For", was officially released on August 21, 2009.

Critical reception

In his review for Allmusic, editor Andy Kellman called Evolution of a Man "a set that is predominantly slow, sparse, and intimate. Most of the album's last two-thirds offers familiar McKnight fare – sensitive, soothing backdrops that are at least comforting when not uplifting. Earlier on, as well as in a couple instances deeper into the album, McKnight takes some risks with tracks that contain little more than pattering percussion and twinkling keyboards; here, the sonics are more memorable than the songs, and not much of the album as a whole holds up to repeated listening. Some of McKnight's devoted fanbase will find the album rather fascinating since it's a change of pace, more a collection of loose sketches than a highly polished set."

Track listing

Charts

References 

Albums produced by Brian McKnight
Brian McKnight albums
2009 albums